Interposition is an asserted right of a U.S. state to oppose actions of the federal government.

Interposition may also refer to:
Interposition trunk, a type of telecommunications channel
Interposition (grammar), a usage of a preposition between identical words
Interposition, also known as occultation, a depth perception cue

See also
Interposed nucleus, in the cerebellum
Interposer, an electrical interface
Interference (chess)